Guy Hendrix Dyas (born 20 August 1968) is a British American production designer. He collaborated with Christopher Nolan on his science fiction thriller Inception which earned him an Academy Award nomination as well as a BAFTA Award for Best Production Design. In 2017, Dyas was nominated for another Academy Award, this time for his work on Passengers. In 2010, Dyas became the first British designer to win a Goya Award for Best Production Design for his work on Alejandro Amenábar's historical epic Agora which premiered at the 2009 Cannes Film Festival. Dyas previously received three consecutive Art Directors Guild Award nominations for his production design work on Steven Spielberg's Indiana Jones and the Kingdom of the Crystal Skull, Shekhar Kapur's Elizabeth: The Golden Age and Superman Returns for Bryan Singer. He won an ADG award in 2011 for Inception. He also earned a BAFTA Award nomination in 2007 for Best Production Design for Elizabeth: The Golden Age and for four years in a row Dyas has been named by The Sunday Times as one of the top ten Brits working behind the camera in Hollywood.

Selected filmography
 Robopocalypse (TBA) - Steven Spielberg
 Spencer (2021) - Pablo Larraín
 Lisey's Story (2021) - Pablo Larrain, J.J. Abrams and Stephen King
 Gemini Man (2019) - Ang Lee
 The Nutcracker and the Four Realms (2018) - Lasse Hallstrom and Joe Johnston
 Passengers (2016) - Morten Tyldum
 Steve Jobs (2015) - Danny Boyle
 Blackhat (2015) - Michael Mann
 Inception (2010) - Christopher Nolan
 Agora (2009) - Alejandro Amenabar
 Indiana Jones and the Kingdom of the Crystal Skull (2008) - Steven Spielberg 
 Elizabeth: The Golden Age (2007) - Shekhar Kapur
 Superman Returns (2006) - Bryan Singer
 The Brothers Grimm (2005) - Terry Gilliam
 X2 (2003) - Bryan Singer

Awards & Nominations 
2017: Nominated by the Academy of Motion Pictures Arts and Sciences for an Academy Award for Best Production Design for Passengers
2011: Nominated by the Academy of Motion Pictures Arts and Sciences for an Academy Award for Best Art Direction for Inception
2011: Winner of a British Academy of Film and Television Arts award for Best Production Design for Inception
2008: Nominated for a British Academy of Film and Television Arts award for Best Production Design for Elizabeth: The Golden Age
2017: Winner of an Art Directors Guild production design award for Passengers
2011: Winner of an Art Directors Guild production design award for Inception
2009: Nominated for an Art Directors Guild production design award for Indiana Jones and the Kingdom of the Crystal Skull
2008: Nominated for an Art Directors Guild production design award for Elizabeth: The Golden Age
2007: Nominated for an Art Directors Guild production design award for Superman Returns
2001: Nominated for an Art Directors Guild production design award for The Cell as Art Director
2011: Winner of a Critics' Choice Movie Awards for Best Achievement in Production Design for Inception
2010: Winner of a Goya Awards for Best Achievement in Production Design for Agora
2011: Winner of a Los Angeles Film Critics Association Award for Best Production Design for Inception
2010: Winner of an American Film Institute Award for Inception

External links 
 Guy Hendrix Dyas Official site
 The Designs of Guy Hendrix Dyas
 
 Terry Gilliam's The Brothers Grimm Production Design by Guy Hendrix Dyas
 Entertainment Weekly's 2003 "it List"
 The Art of X2, Newmarket Press

1968 births
Living people
Hendrix Dyas, Guy
Best Production Design BAFTA Award winners
British film designers
English industrial designers